Faleh Abed Hajim  (1 July 1949 –18 September 2019) was an Iraqi football striker who played for Iraq between 1969 and 1971. He also played for Al-Diwaniya.

Career statistics

International goals
Scores and results list Iraq's goal tally first.

References

1946 births
2019 deaths
Iraqi footballers
Al-Diwaniya FC players
Iraq international footballers
Association football forwards
People from Al-Qādisiyyah Governorate